The Immigration and Nationality Act of 1952, also known as the McCarran–Walter Act, codified under Title 8 of the United States Code, governs immigration to and citizenship in the United States. It came into effect on June 27, 1952. Before the Immigration and Nationality Act of 1952, various statutes governed immigration law but were not organized within one body of text. According to its own text, the Act is officially entitled as just the Immigration and Nationality Act, but it is frequently specified with 1952 at the end in order to differentiate it from the 1965 law.

Legislative history 
The Immigration and Nationality Act of 1952 was debated and passed in the context of Cold War-era fears and suspicions of infiltrating Communist and Soviet spies and sympathizers within American institutions and federal government. Anticommunist sentiment associated with the Second Red Scare and McCarthyism in the United States led restrictionists to push for selective immigration to preserve national security. Senator Pat McCarran (D-Nevada), the chairman of the Senate Judiciary Committee, proposed an immigration bill to maintain status quo in the United States and to safeguard the country from Communism, "Jewish interests", and undesirables that he deemed as external threats to national security. His immigration bill included restrictive measures such as increased review of potential immigrants, stepped-up deportation, and more stringent naturalization procedures. The bill also placed a preference on economic potential, special skills, and education. In addition, Representative Francis E. Walter (D-Pennsylvania) proposed a similar immigration bill to the House.

In response to the liberal immigration bill of Representative Emanuel Celler (D-New York) and Senator Herbert H. Lehman (D-New York), both McCarran and Walter combined their restrictive immigration proposals into the McCarran–Walter bill and recruited support of patriotic and veteran organizations. However, various immigration reform advocacy groups and testimonies by representatives from ethnic coalitions, civil rights organizations, and labor unions challenged proposals of restrictive immigration and pushed for a more inclusive immigration reform. Opponents of the restrictive bill such as Lehman attempted to strategize a way to bring the groups together to resist McCarran's actions. Despite the efforts to resist, McCarran's influence as chairman of the Senate Judiciary Committee ultimately overpowered the liberal immigration reform coalition.

President Harry Truman vetoed the McCarran-Walter Act because it continued national-origins quotas that discriminated against potential allies that contained communist groups. However, Congress overrode the veto by a two-thirds vote of each house. The 82nd United States Congress enacted the H.R. 5678 bill, which became effective on June 27, 1952. The passage of the McCarran-Walter bill, known as the Immigration and Nationality Act of 1952, solidified more restrictive immigration movement in the United States.

Provisions
The Act abolished racial restrictions found in United States immigration and naturalization statutes going back to the Naturalization Act of 1790. The 1952 Act retained a quota system for nationalities and regions. Eventually, the Act established a preference system that determined which ethnic groups were desirable immigrants and placed great importance on labor qualifications. The Act defined three types of immigrants: immigrants with special skills or who had relatives who were U.S. citizens, who were exempt from quotas and who were to be admitted without restrictions; average immigrants whose numbers were not supposed to exceed 270,000 per year; and refugees.

It expanded the definition of the "United States" for nationality purposes, which already included Puerto Rico and the Virgin Islands, to add Guam. Persons born in these territories on or after December 24, 1952 acquire U.S. citizenship at birth on the same terms as persons born in other parts of the United States.

National quotas
The McCarran-Walter Act abolished the "alien ineligible to citizenship" category from US immigration law, which in practice only applied to people of Asian descent. Quotas of 100 immigrants per country were established for Asian countries—however, people of Asian descent who were citizens of a non-Asian country also counted towards the quota of their ancestral Asian country. Overall immigration from the "Asiatic barred zone" was capped at 2000 people annually. Passage of the act was strongly lobbied for by the Chinese American Citizens Alliance, Japanese American Citizens League, Filipino Federation of America, and Korean National Association; though as an incremental measure, as those organizations wished to see national origins quotas abolished altogether.

The McCarran-Walter Act allowed for people of Asian descent to immigrate and to become citizens, which had been banned by laws like the Chinese Exclusion Act of 1882 and Asian Exclusion Act of 1924. Chinese immigration, in particular, had been allowed for a decade prior to McCarran-Walter by the Magnuson Act of 1943, which was passed because of America's World War II alliance with China. Japanese Americans and Korean Americans were first allowed to naturalize by the McCarran-Walter Act. Overall changes in the perceptions of Asians were made possible by Cold War politics; the Displaced Persons Act of 1948 allowed anticommunist Chinese American students who feared returning to the Chinese Civil War to stay in the United States; and these provisions would be expanded by the Refugee Relief Act of 1953.

A key provision, however, authorized the President to overrule those quotas. Section 212(f), states: 

The 1952 Act was amended by the Immigration and Nationality Act of 1965, to include a significant provision stating:

Executive Order 13769, superseding Executive Order 13780 and Presidential Proclamation 9645, all of which were issued in 2017 under the authority of the Immigration and Nationality Acts and sought to impose a blanket restriction on entry into the United States of people from several nations, were challenged in court and parts were initially subject to various restraining orders. On June 26, 2018, the U.S. Supreme Court upheld the president's authority to implement these restrictions in the case of Trump v. Hawaii.

Quotas by country under successive laws 
Listed below are historical quotas on immigration from the Eastern Hemisphere, by country, as applied in given fiscal years ending June 30, calculated according to successive immigration laws and revisions from the Emergency Quota Act of 1921, to the final quota year of 1965, as computed under the 1952 Act revisions. Whereas the 1924 Act calculated each country's quota by applying the percentage share of each national origin in the 1920 U.S. population in proportion to the number 150,000, the 1952 Act adopted a simplified formula limiting each country to a flat quota of one-sixth of one percent of that nationality's 1920 population count, with a minimum quota of 100. The 1922 and 1925 systems based on dated census records of the foreign-born population were intended as temporary measures; the National Origins Formula based on the 1920 Census of the total U.S. population took effect on July 1, 1929, with the modifications of McCarran–Walter in effect from 1953 to 1965.

Naturalization
A 1962 guideline explained procedures under the Act:

Preference system
The McCarran-Walter Act linked naturalization to the idea of "good moral character" measured by a person's ability to behave morally and honor the Constitution and laws of the United States. The concept of "good moral character" dated back to the Naturalization Act of 1790. The Immigration and Nationality Act of 1952 required applicants to be a person of good moral character who adhered to the principles of the Constitution and was in favorable disposition to the United States. The act gave the government the authority to deem an immigrant who lacks good moral character ineligible for admission or naturalization and deport the immigrant who engaged in a list of activities that violated the "good moral character" requirement such as crimes involving moral turpitude, illegal gambling, alcohol use, drug trafficking, prostitution, unlawful voting, fraud, etc. These violations of the good moral character requirement undermined the U.S. national security.

Immigration and Nationality Act of 1952 eliminated the contact labor bar and placed employment-based preferences for aliens with economic potential, skills, and education. In addition, the act created H-1, a temporary visa category for nonimmigrants with merit and ability. The act also created the H-2, a process to approve visa for temporary foreign laborers if there is no one available to work in the labor field.

Class of aliens inadmissible and ineligible for visa
Before the Immigration and Nationality Act of 1952, the U.S. Bureau of Immigration vetted newcomers to the United States and often denied entry to new immigrants on subjective conclusion of "perverse" acts such as homosexuality, prostitution, sexual deviance, crime of moral turpitude, economic dependency, or "perverse" bodies like hermaphrodites or individuals with abnormal or small body parts during the period from 1900 to 1924. During this time, immigration authorities denied immigrants entry on this subjective basis by issuing "likely to be a public charge." However, by the 1950s, the immigration authorities solidified this screening measure into law when they enacted a provision against prostitution or any so-called "immoral sexual act". In addition, aliens deemed feeble-minded, mentally disabled, physically defective, or professional beggars were also ineligible for admission.

The Immigration and Nationality Act of 1952 placed provisions on drinking and substance use as a requirement for admission. The act stated that any immigrant who "is or was…a habitual drunkard" or "narcotic drug addicts or chronic alcoholics" challenged the notion of good moral character, a requirement for citizenship in the United States. As a result, immigrants who participated in excessive alcohol or substance use were inadmissible to the United States.

According to the Immigration and Nationality Act of 1952, polygamy violated the notion of good moral character under Section 101(f). Any alien in a polygamous relationship was inadmissible or ineligible for naturalization as a result. In addition, the polygamy bar denied the polygamous alien to immigration benefits such as employment-based visa, asylum, or relief.

Class of deportable aliens 
Crime involving moral turpitude were acts, behaviors, or offenses that violate the standards of a country. The concept, "crimes involving moral turpitude", have been in United States immigration law since the Immigration Act of 1891, which made those who committed crimes involving moral turpitude inadmissible. Despite the difficulty of defining "crimes involving moral turpitude", the Immigration and Nationality Act of 1952 established provisions that help define "crimes involving moral turpitude". Under sections, "Inadmissible aliens" and "Deportable aliens", aliens were ineligible for naturalization if suspected of or committed criminal convictions, illegal gambling, alcohol use, drug trafficking, prostitution, unlawful voting, etc. within five years of entry. The list of crimes involving moral turpitude lead to removal of the alien.

The Immigration and Nationality Act of 1952 deemed aliens who were anarchists or members of or affiliated with the Communist Party or any other totalitarian organizations that plan to overthrow the United States as deportable aliens. Aliens who were successors of any association of Communism, regardless of name changes, still fell under the deportable aliens. Aliens who advocated, taught, wrote, published in support for communism, a totalitarian dictatorship, and the overthrowing of the United States were also deportable aliens.

Under Section 243(h) of the Immigration and Nationality Act of 1952, the Attorney General had the authority to stop the deportation of an alien if the Attorney General believed that the alien would face physical persecution if he or she returns to the country. The period of withholding deportation was up to the Attorney General as well.

Enforcement
The following list provides examples of those who were excluded from the Act prior to the 1990 amendment. While it has not been substantiated that all of these individuals formally petitioned to become United States citizens, many were banned from traveling to the US because of anti-American political views and/or criminal records. Among those listed, there are noted communists, socialists, and anti-American sympathizers.
 Kōbō Abe, Japanese writer
 Tom Bottomore, British sociologist
 Dennis Brutus, South African writer
 Boris Christoff, Bulgarian opera singer
 Julio Cortázar, Argentine novelist
 Mahmoud Darwish, Palestinian poet
 Michel Foucault, French philosopher
 Dario Fo, Italian playwright and recipient of the 1997 Nobel Prize in Literature
 Carlos Fuentes, Mexican writer
 Gabriel García Márquez, Colombian novelist and recipient of the 1982 Nobel Prize in Literature
 Graham Greene, British writer
 Doris Lessing, writer and recipient of the 2007 Nobel Prize in Literature (Southern Rhodesia (now Zimbabwe) / Great Britain)
 Ernest Mandel, scholar and Trotskyist activist
 Farley Mowat, Canadian writer
 Jan Myrdal, Swedish scholar
 Pablo Neruda, Chilean poet and recipient of the 1971 Nobel Prize in Literature
 Carl Paivio, Finnish labor activist and anarchist
 Angel Rama, Uruguayan scholar
 Margaret Randall, writer, translator, and activist
 Pierre Trudeau, prior to becoming Prime Minister of Canada.

Modifications
Parts of the Act remain in place today, but it has been amended many times and was modified substantially by the Immigration and Nationality Services Act of 1965.

When regulations issued under the authority of the Passport Act of 1926 were challenged in Haig v. Agee, Congress enacted § 707(b) of the Foreign Relations Authorization Act, Fiscal Year 1979, amending § 215 of the Immigration and Nationality Act making it unlawful to travel abroad without a passport. Until that legislation, under the Travel Control Act of 1918, the president had the authority to require passports for foreign travel only in time of war.

Some provisions that excluded certain classes of immigrants based on their political beliefs were revoked by the Immigration Act of 1990; however, members of Communist Parties are still banned from becoming citizens of the United States.

After the September 11, 2001 attacks, President George W. Bush implemented the National Security Entry-Exit Registration System and other border and immigration controls.

In January 2017, President Donald Trump's Executive Order 13769 made reference to the "Immigration and Nationality Act".

See also
 Bracero program
 History of immigration to the United States
 History of laws concerning immigration and naturalization in the United States
 Immigration Act of 1924
 Immigration and Nationality Act of 1965
 List of United States immigration laws
 National Origins Formula
 Remain in Mexico

References

Further reading
  Bennett, Marion T. "The immigration and nationality (McCarran-Walter) Act of 1952, as Amended to 1965." The Annals of the American Academy of Political and Social Science 367.1 (1966): 127–136.
 Chin, Gabriel J. "The civil rights revolution comes to immigration law: A new look at the Immigration and Nationality Act of 1965." North Carolina Law Review 75 (1996): 273+.
 Daniels. Roger, ed. Immigration and the Legacy of Harry S. Truman (2010)
 Rosenfield, Harry N. "Necessary administrative reforms in the Immigration and Nationality Act of 1952." Fordham Law Review 27 (1958): 145+.

External links
 Immigration and Nationality Act, as amended, in PDF/HTML/details in the GPO Statute Compilations collection
 As codified in 8 USC chapter 12 on LII
 Immigration regulations in 8 CFR Subchapter B of the CFR on LII
 Bertram M. Bernard Immigration Law Index, U.S. immigration and nationality law, 1952–82

United States federal immigration and nationality legislation
1952 in American law
History of immigration to the United States
Anti-communism in the United States
Political repression in the United States
United States immigration law
1952 in international relations
82nd United States Congress
June 1952 events in the United States